DCAP-BTLS is a mnemonic acronym to remember specific soft tissue injuries to look for during a person's assessment after a traumatic injury. This is a key component during a rapid trauma assessment.

Meaning
The parts of the mnemonic are:

DCAP-BTLS
 Deformities
 Contusions 
 Abrasion
 Penetrations/pneumothorax
 Burn
 Tenderness
 Lacerations
 Swelling

See also
SAMPLE history
OPQRST

References

Medical mnemonics
Emergency medical services
First aid
Mnemonic acronyms